Good Bones is a collection of short fiction (most stories only a few pages long) by Canadian author Margaret Atwood.  The collection was originally published in 1992.

The collection explores the sinister side of classical myths, traditional Anglo-European folklore and literary archetypes. Through the stories, Atwood gives voice to the "bad girls": the stupid, ugly or wicked stepmothers and stepsisters who feature as antagonists in the archetypes Atwood explores. For example, the Little Red Hen, the stepsisters from 'Cinderella', and Gertrude from William Shakespeare's Hamlet get their say. Ultimately, these stories explore the danger of life (which inevitably ends in death) and the power of telling one's own story.

The book was republished in 1994, in combination with another Atwood work called Murder in the Dark, as part of the expanded collection Good Bones and Simple Murders.

References 

, pg. 1.

1992 short story collections
Short story collections by Margaret Atwood
Coach House Press books